Sarab-e Zarem (also Romanized as Sarāb-e Zārem) is a village in Shirvan Rural District, in the Central District of Borujerd County, Lorestan Province, Iran. At the 2006 census, its population was 471, in 131 families.

References 

Towns and villages in Borujerd County